Mostek is a municipality and village in Trutnov District in the Hradec Králové Region of the Czech Republic. It has about 1,200 inhabitants.

Administrative parts
Villages of Debrné, Souvrať and Zadní Mostek are administrative parts of Mostek.

References

Villages in Trutnov District